Thomas Anthony Marino (born August 13, 1952) is an American politician and attorney, who served as a United States Representative from Pennsylvania from 2011 to 2019. A member of the Republican Party, Marino was the United States Attorney for the United States District Court for the Middle District of Pennsylvania in his early career.

On September 1, 2017, President Donald Trump nominated Marino to be Director of the Office of National Drug Control Policy, commonly known as the "drug czar". He withdrew on October 17, 2017, following reports that he had been the chief architect behind a bill that protected pharmaceutical manufacturers and distributors and crippled the DEA's ability to combat the U.S. opioid epidemic. Two weeks after being sworn in for his fifth term, Marino announced his resignation from Congress, effective January 23, 2019, to work in the private sector.

Early life and education
Marino was born on August 13, 1952, and raised in Lycoming County, Pennsylvania. After graduating from high school, Marino went to work in the factories of central Pennsylvania. At age 30, Marino enrolled in the former Williamsport Area Community College (now Pennsylvania College of Technology). Marino would then transfer to Lycoming College, where he graduated magna cum laude, before completing his J.D. degree at Dickinson School of Law.

Law career
After beginning his legal career in private practice, Marino served as a Lycoming County District Attorney from 1992 to 2002. In 2002, Marino was appointed the United States Attorney for the United States District Court for the Middle District of Pennsylvania by President George W. Bush. During his tenure as U.S. Attorney, Marino led the prosecution of executives of Rite Aid for criminal fraud. The company's former president pleaded guilty to conspiring to inflate income by $1.6 billion and conspiring to obstruct justice.

In 2007, Marino resigned from his role as U.S. Attorney for the Middle District of Pennsylvania. In 2007, the new U.S. Attorney for the Middle District of Pennsylvania, Peter Smith, confirmed that neither Marino, nor his office, were ever under review or investigation.

U.S. House of Representatives

District
Pennsylvania's 10th congressional district, located in central and northeastern Pennsylvania, includes Bradford County, Juniata County, Lycoming County, Mifflin County, Pike County, Snyder County, Sullivan County, Susquehanna County, Union County, Wayne County, and portions of Perry County, Tioga County, Lackawanna County, Monroe County, and Northumberland County.

Elections
2010

In 2010, Marino decided to challenge incumbent Democratic U.S. Congressman Chris Carney of Pennsylvania's 10th congressional district. He won the three-candidate Republican primary with 41% of the vote, defeating Dave Madeira (31%) and Snyder County Commissioner Malcolm Derk (28%). On November 2, 2010, Marino defeated Carney 55-45%.

2012

In 2012, Marino won re-election to a second term, defeating Democratic nominee Philip Scollo 66%–34%.

2014
In 2014, Marino faced off against Independent Nick Troiano and Democrat Scott Brion. Marino garnered 62% of the vote with Troiano received 13% and Brion received 25%.

Tenure
Marino ranked third among Pennsylvania's congressional delegation in Americans for Prosperity's 2012 scorecard (70%) and fifth in the Club for Growth's 2012 scorecard (63%).

Committees
 Committee on the Judiciary
 Chairman of the Subcommittee on Regulatory Reform, Commercial and Antitrust Law
Subcommittee on Courts, Intellectual Property and the Internet
 Committee on Foreign Affairs
Subcommittee on Asia and the Pacific
 Subcommittee on Europe and Eurasia
 Committee on Homeland Security
 Subcommittee on Cybersecurity, Infrastructure Protection, and Security Technologies
 Subcommittee on Emergency Preparedness, Response, and Communications (Vice Chair)

Marino was a member of the House Baltic Caucus.

Resignation
After a court-ordered redistricting, Marino's district was renumbered as the 12th District ahead of the 2018 elections. It lost its suburban territory closer to Scranton and Wilkes-Barre, in the process losing its last connection to longtime congressman Joseph McDade, who represented the district from 1961 to 1999. To make up for the loss in population, it was pushed slightly westward to take in State College, home to Penn State.

The new district was no less Republican than its predecessor, and Marino easily won a fifth term, defeating Democrat Marc Friedenberg with 66 percent of the vote. On January 17, 2019, two weeks after being sworn in for a new term, Marino announced his resignation from the House, to be effective January 23, 2019. Marino described his decision to resign as follows: "Having spent over two decades serving the public, I have chosen to take a position in the private sector where I can use both my legal and business experience to create jobs around the nation." Marino's resignation required a special election to be called by Pennsylvania Governor Tom Wolf via a writ of election within 10 days of Marino's resignation becoming effective on January 23, 2019. Per Pennsylvania law, the special election had to occur no fewer than 60 days following the gubernatorial proclamation being made. On May 21, 2019, Republican state representative Fred Keller won the special election with 68.1% of the vote, defeating Marino's 2018 Democratic opponent Marc Friedenberg, and succeeded Marino in Congress.

Political positions
Marino supported the death penalty. He believed that the mentally ill and criminals should not be able to obtain guns.

In July 2013, Marino voted against Justin Amash's amendment #413 to H.R. 2397 "To end authority for the blanket collection of records under the Patriot Act and bar the NSA and other agencies from using Section 215 of the Patriot Act to collect records, including telephone call records, that pertain to persons who are not subject to an investigation under Section 215."

In 2011, Marino became a co-sponsor of Bill H.R.3261, also known as the Stop Online Piracy Act.

A former supporter of President Donald Trump, who was co-chair of Trump's 2016 presidential campaign in Pennsylvania, Marino broke with Trump in 2022. This came after Trump's decision not to endorse former Congressman Lou Barletta in the Republican primary election for Governor of Pennsylvania. In not endorsing Barletta, who co-chaired alongside him, Marino accused Trump of throwing Barletta "under the bus."  Marino also said he would thus not support any candidate who had Trump's endorsement.

Pharmaceuticals
In October 2017, The Washington Post and 60 Minutes reported that Marino was the chief advocate of a 2016 bill that hobbled the ability of the Drug Enforcement Administration to combat the opioid epidemic. Marino introduced the bill, the Ensuring Patient Access and Effective Drug Enforcement Act, in 2014 and again in 2015; it failed both times. The 2014 version was opposed by the DEA and the Justice Department, but the 2015 version was sold as an attempt to "work with the pharmaceutical companies" and was subject to heavy lobbying. A similar version introduced in the Senate by Orrin Hatch passed both houses of Congress by unanimous consent and was signed into law by President Barack Obama on April 19, 2016. The legislation aimed to weaken the DEA's authority to take enforcement action against drug distributors who supplied unscrupulous physician and pharmacists with opioids for diversion to the black market. Previously, the DEA had fined individuals who profited on suspicious sales of painkillers and repeatedly ignored warnings that the painkillers were sold illegally. The new legislation would have made it "virtually impossible" for the DEA to stop these sales, according to internal agency documents, Justice Department documents, and the DEA Chief Administrative Law Judge John J. Mulrooney II. Marino, whose district was heavily affected by the opioid epidemic, declined to comment on the reports. The drug industry spent at least $102 million lobbying Congress on the legislation between 2014 and 2016. McKesson Corporation, AmerisourceBergen, and Cardinal Health spent $13 million lobbying in support of the bill. When Joseph Rannazzisi, the chief of the Drug Enforcement Administration (DEA)'s Office of Diversion Control, strongly criticized the bill, Marino and his cosponsor Marsha Blackburn demanded that the drug diversion enforcer be investigated by the United States Department of Justice Office of the Inspector General. Nothing came of the investigation but Rannazzisi was removed from his position in August and retired in October 2015. According to The New York Times, Blackburn's best known legislation was that bill which revised the legal standard that the Drug Enforcement Administration (DEA) had used to establish that "a significant and present risk of death or serious bodily harm that is more likely than not to occur," rather than the previous tougher standard of "imminent danger," before suspending the manufacturer's opioid drug shipments. The legislation was criticized in internal Justice Department documents, and by the DEA's chief administrative law judge, as hampering DEA enforcement actions against drug distribution companies engaging in black-market sales. Rannazzisi said he informed Blackburn's staffers precisely what the effects would be as a result of the passage of a 2016 law the two sponsored, as national awareness grew regarding a crisis in the prescriptions of opioids in the United States. Blackburn admitted her bill had what she characterized as unforeseen “unintended consequences,” but Rannazzisi said they should have been anticipated. He said that during a July 2014 conference call he informed congressional staffers the bill would cause more difficulties for the DEA if it pursued corporations which were illegally distributing such drugs.

Post-Congressional Career

Office of National Drug Control Policy
In September 2017, President Donald Trump nominated Marino to serve as the Director of the Office of National Drug Control Policy ("drug czar").  In October, Senator Joe Manchin (D-WV) called on Trump to withdraw Marino's nomination. Trump said he would "look into" reports about Marino, putting his nomination in question. On October 17, 2017, Marino withdrew his nomination.

2016 Presidential Transition Team Executive Committee
In 2016, Marino was announced as a member of then President-Elect Donald Trump's presidential transition team. The transition team was a group of around 100 aides, policy experts, government affairs officials, and former government officials who were tasked with vetting, interviewing, and recommending individuals for top cabinet and staff roles in Trump's administration. According to Fox News, he was part of the team's executive committee.

Lycoming County D.A. campaign
In 2023, Marino announced he would run for District Attorney of Lycoming County, Pennsylvania, which he held once before. Despite earlier rumors, Marino said he would not run against incumbent Republican D.A. Ryan C. Gardner. However, Gardner later announced his decision to not run for re-election, instead running for a judge seat. Gardner's decision thus left the D.A. position open for Marino to run. Until his candidacy announcement, Marino and his wife lived in Florida. He then moved back to Lycoming County. Because of his recent residency in Florida, two challenges have been made to invalidate his candidacy. One challenge has been dismissed by a judge, and the other has been sent for review by the Pennsylvania Attorney General.

Personal life
Marino and his wife Edie currently live in Loyalsock Township, Pennsylvania.

In February 2019, Marino said health issues led to his January resignation from Congress. Multiple battles with kidney cancer have left Marino with only part of one kidney, and after another kidney problem required surgery, he made his decision to resign.

Marino is Roman Catholic.

References

External links
 
 
 

|-

|-

|-

|-

1952 births
Living people
20th-century American lawyers
21st-century American politicians
Catholics from Pennsylvania
Dickinson School of Law alumni
County district attorneys in Pennsylvania
Lycoming College alumni
Pennsylvania lawyers
People from Lycoming County, Pennsylvania
Republican Party members of the United States House of Representatives from Pennsylvania
United States Attorneys for the Middle District of Pennsylvania
American people of Italian descent